Seguer is a surname. Notable people with the surname include:

Guillem Seguer, 14th-century Catalan sculptor and architect
Josep Seguer (1923–2014), Spanish footballer and manager
Mohamed Seguer (born 1985), Algerian footballer

See also
Seger

Catalan-language surnames